ERS, Ers or ers may refer to:

Arts and entertainment 
 Egyptian Ratscrew or Slap, a card game
 Elevator Repair Service, an American theater ensemble

Economics and finance 
 ERS10, a share index of the Serbian Banja Luka Stock Exchange
 Economic Research Service, a statistical agency of the U.S. Department of Agriculture
 Employees Retirement System of Texas, an agency of the Texas state government
 ERS (insurance company) (formerly Equity Insurance Group), a specialist motor insurer in London, England
 Evaluated Receipt Settlement, a form of invoicing

Science and technology 
 Energy recovery system, as found in Formula One, including kinetic energy recovery system
 Electronic Reporting System, used by European Union fisheries
 Ellipsoidal reflector spotlight
 European Remote-Sensing Satellites
 European Respiratory Society, a professional association of lung physicians
 Exposed riverine sediments

Other uses 
 Ers river, now known as Hers-Mort, a tributary of the Garonne River in France
 Electoral Reform Society, a political group in the United Kingdom
 Electoral Reform Services, a company part-owned by the Electoral Reform Society providing balloting and polling services
 Elektroprivreda Republike Srpske, a state-owned power company in Bosnia and Herzegovina
 Eros Airport, serving Windhoek, Namibia
 ERS Railways, a Dutch rail freight company
 Ersuic languages
 NHS e-Referral Service, in the United Kingdom

See also

 Erse (disambiguation)
 ER (disambiguation)